North Carolina Highway 261 (NC 261) is a short state highway going from Bakersville to the Tennessee state line where the road turns into Tennessee State Route 143 (SR 143). The road is close to Roan Mountain State Park in Tennessee.

Route description
NC 261 begins in the town of Bakersville, the county seat of Mitchell County, at a stop-controlled T-intersection with NC 226 (Crimson Laurel Way). It immediately climbs a short hill out of the town and into the Pisgah National Forest. As it starts to head in a northeastern general direction, NC 261 begins a winding course between the Cub Creek and Pumpkin Patch Mountain. After crossing Pumpkin Patch Gap (elevation approximately ), the road begins to follow the Little Rock Creek and pass through the communities of Cookstown and Glen Ayre.  outside of Glen Ayre, after paralleling more streams, NC 261 starts a climb up to Roan Mountain. Afters some hairpin turns, the road reaches Carvers Gap (elevation ) where the state line and Appalachian Trail crosses the road. Tennessee SR 143 continues ahead towards the community of Roan Mountain.

History
What became NC 261 was an unnumbered gravel and dirt road between Bakersville and Carvers Gap. Between 1949 and 1953, the state took over the road and paved it with asphalt. The routing has not changed since its original designation.

Junction list

References

External links

 NCRoads.com: N.C. 261

261
Transportation in Mitchell County, North Carolina